Baoma Chiefdom is a chiefdom in Bo District of Sierra Leone. Its capital is Baoma.

References 

Chiefdoms of Sierra Leone
Southern Province, Sierra Leone